The Senior Salaries Review Body, established 1971 provides advice  to the Prime Minister, Lord Chancellor and Secretary of State for Defence relating to remuneration of holders of public office.

Additionally it advises the Prime Minister on pay and pensions of Members of Parliament.

External links
 Office of Manpower Economics

Notes

Non-departmental public bodies of the United Kingdom government